The 2019–20 Deodhar Trophy was the 47th edition of the Deodhar Trophy, a List A cricket competition in India. It was contested between three teams selected by the Board of Control for Cricket in India (BCCI). It took place in October and November 2019, after the Duleep Trophy and before the Ranji Trophy. India C were the defending champions.

India A lost both of their matches, therefore India B and India C progressed to the final. India B beat India C by 51 runs in the final to win the tournament.

Squads

Prithvi Raj was initially named in India B's squad, but moved to India A, following an injury to Sandeep Warrier.

Group stage

Points table

Matches

Final

References

External links
 Series home at ESPN Cricinfo

2019 in Indian cricket
Professional 50-over cricket competitions
Deodhar Trophy
Deodhar Trophy